The following events occurred in January 1966:

January 1, 1966 (Saturday)
The New Zealand Australia Free Trade Agreement came into force. It would be superseded in 1983 by the new Australia New Zealand Closer Economic Relations Trade Agreement.
In the Soviet Union, Aeroflot Flight 185, a twin-engine Ilyushin Il-14 en route from the east coast city of Magadan to Petropavlovsk-Kamchatsky, crashed into a mountain on the Kamchatka Peninsula after engine trouble and icing on the wings caused it to lose altitude.
Two separate Garuda Airlines DC-3 airplanes took off from Jakarta, Indonesia, both due to make their first stop at the island of Sumatra at Palembang, but neither arrived. In all, 34 people died in the crashes.
A military coup brought Colonel Jean-Bédel Bokassa into power in the Central African Republic, ousting President David Dacko. Bokassa would name himself as President on January 4, and crown himself as Emperor Bokassa I of the Central African Empire on December 4, 1977. Captain Alexandre Banza, the co-leader of the coup, would be accused of treason and executed by Bokassa in 1969.
A strike of the 36,000 public transportation workers in New York City began at 5:00 in the morning, as the New York City Transit Authority's subway trains and buses halted service. It was the first time in the city's history that the commuters were without either bus or subway service at the same time, and the full effect would be felt on Monday morning, when six million people would have to find alternate transportation.
Homer E. Newell, NASA Associate Administrator for Space Science and Applications, announced opportunities for study grants to competent astronomers for conceptual and preliminary design work leading to instrumentation to be flown in the 1969-1975 period. A description of the Apollo telescope mount was included.
Between January 1 and 6, Kennedy Space Center (KSC) announced appointment of John P. Claybourne as Chief of the newly created Future Studies Office within the KSC Engineering and Development Directorate. Claybourne's office was assigned responsibility for overall planning and coordination of the Center's studies in this area, which would parallel continuing development of Apollo-Saturn and Apollo Applications programs at Marshall Space Flight Center (MSFC) and Manned Spacecraft Center (MSC). John G. Shinkle succeeded Claybourne as Deputy Director for Plans, Programs, and Resources.
In college football, the #1 Michigan State Spartans were upset by the #5 UCLA Bruins, 14-12, in the Rose Bowl, and the #2 Arkansas Razorbacks were toppled, 14-7, by the unranked LSU Tigers in the Cotton Bowl, setting up that evening's Orange Bowl game between the #3 Nebraska Cornhuskers and the #4 Alabama Crimson Tide as the game that was likely to determine the unofficial national champion in the final poll of the season. Alabama won convincingly, 39-28, and would be voted #1 in the final Associated Press poll of sportswriters.
Died: Vincent Auriol, 81, French politician, President of the Fourth Republic from 1947 to 1954

January 2, 1966 (Sunday)
The Green Bay Packers won the NFL Championship at home, beating the Cleveland Browns, 23-12.
Prime Minister Fidel Castro of Cuba announced that his nation's trade agreement with the People's Republic of China, wherein Cuba imported Chinese rice and China purchased Cuban sugar, had been terminated by the Chinese.

January 3, 1966 (Monday)
In the Republic of Upper Volta, Major General Sangoulé Lamizana, the Chief of the Armed Forces General Staff, led a coup d'état that overthrew the government of President Maurice Yaméogo. General Lamizana would rule the West African nation (now called Burkina Faso) for almost 15 years, until being overthrown himself in a coup on November 25, 1980.
The Atlantic Richfield Company, which became the 10th most productive oil company in the United States, was created as stockholders of both the Atlantic Refining Company and the Richfield Oil Corporation approved a merger after Atlantic was granted authority by the U.S. Department of Justice to purchase $575,000,000 for Richfield's stock. Atlantic Richfield would continue to market gasoline under Atlantic Refining's brand name, ARCO.
Died:
Irving L. Branch, 53, United States Air Force general, in crash of Northrop T-38 Talon into Puget Sound
Marguerite Higgins, 45, Pulitzer Prize-winning war correspondent who had covered both World War II and the Korean War. Ms. Higgins had been hospitalized since November, because of complications from an illness caused by a parasite contracted during a trip to the war zone in South Vietnam.

January 4, 1966 (Tuesday)
India's Prime Minister Lal Bahadur Shastri and Pakistan's President Ayub Khan met in Tashkent, the Uzbek capital, at the time a part of the Soviet Union, for a conference arranged by Soviet Prime Minister Alexei Kosygin, aimed at arriving at an agreement to end the Indo-Pakistani War of 1965.

Film and television actor Ronald Reagan announced that he would seek the Republican nomination for Governor of California in order to challenge incumbent Governor Pat Brown.  Reagan purchased air time on 15 television stations throughout California in order to broadcast his half-hour taped announcement.   At the time, the future President of the United States was still hosting the television show Death Valley Days.
A gas leak fire at an oil refinery in Feyzin, near Lyon, France, killed 18 people and injured 84.
The Alabama Crimson Tide received the mythical national championship of college football after receiving 37 first place votes in the postseason poll of 57 sportswriters, and 537 points overall, while the Michigan State Spartans, who had been #1 until their being upset in the Rose Bowl, finished second with 18 first place votes and 479 points overall.
The St. John's University strike of 1966–67 began in New York City; it would last for over a year.
Born: Christian Kern, Chancellor of Austria from 2016 to 2017; in Vienna

January 5, 1966 (Wednesday)
Because of the poor quality of the sound recording of their August 15 concert at Shea Stadium, The Beatles went into a studio and re-recorded most of their songs for dubbing in a TV documentary; crowd noises were dubbed in as well to make the film seem like the original performance. "But what you see in the film," an author would later write, "is what happened that night, and the thrill of the event is clear."
Bobby Baker, who had been a chief adviser to Lyndon Johnson when the President had been the Majority Leader in the U.S. Senate, was indicted by a federal grand jury for theft, tax evasion, and misappropriation of about $100,000 in contributions to Johnson's political campaigns. The U.S. Justice Department investigation of Baker had started in late 1963, when Johnson had been Vice-President, but had halted after the Kennedy assassination elevated Johnson to the presidency and was not renewed until after Johnson's election in 1964. Baker would not be convicted until five years later, after Johnson had left office.
Atlas 5302, target launch vehicle for Gemini VIII, was erected at complex 14. Air Force Space Systems Division and General Dynamics/Convair had begun intensive efforts to ensure the vehicle's flight readiness immediately after the Agena failure on October 25, 1965. The effort resulted in procedural and design changes intended to improve vehicle reliability. Of the 20 engineering change proposal differences between Atlas 5301 (launched October 25) and Atlas 5302, all but one were proven in other Atlas flights before Atlas 5302 was launched. The exception was a new destruct unit which flew for the first time in Atlas 5302. Booster subsystems tests continued until February 23.
Died: Gian Gaspare Napolitano, 58, Italian film director and screenwriter

January 6, 1966 (Thursday)
The new government of the Central African Republic severed all ties with the People's Republic of China, which had been providing aid to the nation since 1964.
Civilian and military watercraft evacuated the group, and 17 of the passengers were lifted from longboats by a United States Coast Guard helicopter. It was the second disaster for Windjammer in less than a week.
The Student Nonviolent Coordinating Committee (SNCC) became the first African-American civil rights organization to publicly oppose the Vietnam War. "We are in sympathy with, and support, the men in this country who are unwilling to respond to a military draft which would compel them to contribute their lives to United States aggression in Vietnam in the name of the 'freedom' we find so false in this country", the SNCC statement read in part. "We take note of the fact that 16 percent of the draftees from this country are Negroes called on to stifle the liberation of Vietnam, to preserve a 'democracy' which does not exist for them at home. We ask, where is the draft for the freedom fight in the United States?"
Lockheed delivered its first SR-71 Blackbird, a strategic reconnaissance aircraft that could fly at speeds up to Mach 3, to the U.S. Air Force. The SR-71A prototype would crash only 19 days later.
Harold Robert Perry became the first African-American in more than 90 years to be made a Roman Catholic bishop. The Louisiana native was elevated to the position of auxiliary bishop of New Orleans.
In a letter to the Associate Administrators for Manned Space Flight, Space Science and Applications, and Advanced Research and Technology, NASA Deputy Administrator Robert C. Seamans, Jr., queried them on several alternate approaches for experiment payload planning for the Apollo Applications Program (AAP). His inquiry was prompted by discussions with several individuals from RCA, who suggested a novel approach for NASA to interest the scientific community in NASA's programs through direct participation in the development of scientific equipment. A central problem was the difficulty inherent in incorporating science payloads into such a complex program as AAP, especially in meeting well-defined schedules. Because most teams of university-based scientists were not sufficiently experienced in fabrication and testing to assume this "cradle-to-grave" responsibility for experiment development, the RCA spokesmen put forward the concept of mission-optimized space laboratories wherein actual payload integration planning would occur very early in the hardware planning stage, before any actual development was undertaken. In this manner, logical broad-purpose groupings of laboratory equipment would appear. Such an approach, they contended, would afford significant payload weight and volume reductions and cost benefits. Also, standardization of equipment and sensors would simplify greatly the integration task per se.
Singers Jerry Garcia and Phil Lesh, who had performed as "The Warlocks", appeared for the first time under their new name, the Grateful Dead. The occasion was the fifth, and largest up that time, of the "Acid Test" concerts, where over 2,000 patrons listened to music, many while under the influence of the hallucinogen LSD, and the venue was the Fillmore in San Francisco, California. Garcia and Lesh had appeared at the first of the Acid Tests on November 27, 1965.
Died: James Lawrence Fly, 67, American lawyer and former administrator of the Federal Communications Commission, of cancer.

January 7, 1966 (Friday)
A weather record of 1,825 millimeters of rain (equivalent to 71.85 inches or almost six feet) was reached at the end of a 24-hour period on the Indian Ocean island of Réunion as a consequence of Tropical cyclone Denise.
The Soviet Union launched the Zenit-2 spacecraft Kosmos 104, the thirty-second of 81 such satellites to be launched. The carrier rocket malfunctioned, placing the spacecraft into the wrong orbit, but it still managed to complete most of its imaging mission.
The Dominica Labour Party won 10 of 11 seats in the Dominican general election with a voter turnout of 80.3%. At the time, Dominica was one of the components of the West Indies Federation.
Lou Thesz, dubbed the "Babe Ruth of Pro Wrestling", was defeated for the National Wrestling Association (NWA) championship for the last time, losing to Gene Kiniski. Thesz, whose multiple reigns as NWA champion totaled more than ten years (3,749 days), would later be elected as a charter member of the Professional Wrestling Hall of Fame.

The SR-71 Blackbird spy plane, which had first flown at the end of 1964, went into regular service, as part of the 4200th Strategic Reconnaissance Wing at Beale Air Force Base in California.
Helicopters rescued all 179 people who had been trapped in a Canadian National Railway train by snow that had blocked them in the Fraser Canyon in British Columbia. The airlift was accomplished by three private helicopters and a 22-seat Royal Canadian Air Force helicopter.
Born:
Carolyn Bessette-Kennedy, wife of John F. Kennedy, Jr. (killed in plane crash, 1999)
Jonathan Jackson, U.S. business professor, entrepreneur, and social justice advocate, son of the Rev. Jesse Jackson, in Chicago
Died: Herbert Sandberg, 63, Swedish conductor, librettist, and composer

January 8, 1966 (Saturday)
U.S. and Australian forces fighting in Vietnam jointly launched Operation Crimp, also known as the Battle of the Ho Bo Woods.

William Gopallawa, the Governor-General of Ceylon (now Sri Lanka), declared a state of emergency throughout the South Asian island nation, after protests by the Sinhalese majority against recent regulations that favored the Tamil language. A young Buddhist priest was killed by the army crackdown on the riots. Press censorship and curfews would stay in place for 11 months, ending on December 7, 1966.
McDonnell Aircraft Corporation delivered Gemini spacecraft No. 8 to Cape Kennedy. Fuel cell installation, heater resistance checks, and pyrotechnics buildup lasted two weeks. The spacecraft was then transferred to Merritt Island Launch Area for integrated (Plan X) test with the Agena target vehicle, January 26-28, and extravehicular equipment compatibility test, January 29.
Gemini Agena target vehicle (GATV) 5003 completed its final acceptance tests at Sunnyvale, California, after an elusive command system problem had made it necessary to rerun the final systems test (January 4). No vehicle discrepancy marred the rerun. Air Force Space Systems Division formally accepted GATV 5003 on January 18, after the vehicle acceptance team inspection. It was shipped to Eastern Test Range the same day, but bad weather delayed delivery until January 21. GATV 5003 was to be the target vehicle for Gemini VIII.
Born: Andrew Wood, American grunge musician, in Seattle (d. 1990)

January 9, 1966 (Sunday)

The foundation stone for the Aswan Dam was laid down in Egypt in a ceremony presided over by United Arab Republic President Gamel Abdel Nasser.  The flooding that would follow would require the moving of 50,000 residents, mostly Nubian, from the city of Wadi Halfa.
For the first time, a radar signal was successfully bounced off of the planet Venus and detected on its return to Earth.  Astronomers at the Jodrell Bank Observatory, at the University of Manchester in England, were able to pick up the returning signal on the  diameter Lovell Telescope, which was three times more sensitive than previous radar measuring instruments.
Australian troops began breaking into the Cu Chi tunnels that allowed troops from the north to infiltrate South Vietnam.
Tom Hayden, Herbert Aptheker and Staughton Lynd, returned to the United States after being the first Americans to be invited to tour North Vietnam. Despite the trip being illegal, the three were not charged nor were their American passports confiscated.
Seven sailors on board a Chinese landing craft mutinied, but in the ensuing gun battle only three people, all defectors, survived.  Taiwan President Chiang Kai-shek proclaimed the three mutineers as heroes, and sent a Defense Ministry seaplane to transport them from Matsu.  As the seaplane was flying back to Taiwan, Chinese MiG jets intercepted it and shot it down, killing everyone on board.
The 37th National Board of Review Awards were announced, with The Eleanor Roosevelt Story winning Best Film.
Died: Ladislav Prokeš, 81, Czech chess player

January 10, 1966 (Monday)
The Tashkent Declaration was signed in the city of Tashkent in the Soviet Union's Uzbek SSR at 4:00 p.m. local time, by Prime Minister Shastri of India and President Ayub Khan of Pakistan, bringing an end to the Indo-Pakistani War of 1965.  The two warring nations agreed that, by February 25, they would withdraw their armed personnel to the same locations that they had held on August 5, prior to the war's start.  Prime Minister Shastri would pass away during the night in Tashkent, before his scheduled return to India.
The Georgia House of Representatives voted, 184 to 12, to bar Julian Bond from taking the 136th District seat to which he had been elected in November.  Bond, the first African-American to be elected during the 20th Century, was refused on the grounds that he had written the recent statement by the SNCC opposing the Vietnam War and that, as such, he could not validly swear to support the constitutions of the United States and Georgia.  In 1967, the United States Supreme Court would rule that the denial of Bond's seat was an unconstitutional denial of his right of freedom of speech.
Heavy rains began in Brazil, causing the worst flooding in the 401-year history of Rio de Janeiro, and causing landslides that swept away entire neighborhoods inhabited by the city's poorest residents.  When the downpours ended after four days, at least 363 people had been killed in the Rio de Janeiro State, with 193 bodies recovered from the city slums, 100 in the nearby city of Petrópolis, and 70 others in the surrounding countryside.
The grain ship's cargo had shifted as it was rocked in a fierce storm, causing the ship to list and then to sink. The American freighter Steel Maker rescued four men, and the U.S. Coast Guard cutter Escanaba saved the others.
Died: Vernon Dahmer, 57, African-American civil rights leader, was murdered in his home near Hattiesburg, Mississippi, the day after he had announced that he would begin a voter registration drive for black residents of Forrest County.  White supremacists used gasoline bombs to burn his home; his wife and a 10-year-old daughter escaped, but Mr. Dahmer died of his injuries later in the day at the Hattiesburg Hospital.  On August 21, 1998, after 32 years and four trials that ended in a mistrial, Samuel H. Bowers, who had been the Imperial Wizard of the White Knights of the Ku Klux Klan, would be convicted of ordering the murder and sentenced to life in prison.

January 11, 1966 (Tuesday)
India's Prime Minister Lal Bahadur Shastri was found dead in the dacha where he was staying in Tashkent, in the Soviet Union, the day after he had signed a peace agreement with the Prime Minister of Pakistan.  His wife, Lalita, would claim that he had been poisoned, and the butler who had been attending him would be arrested, but later released.  Other observers have concluded that Shastri, who had twice suffered heart attacks, had died from a cardiac arrest after calling for his personal physician, Dr. R. N. Chugh.
George Rogers was replaced by John Silkin as a Lord of the Treasury in Harold Wilson's first UK government.
Died: Alberto Giacometti, 64, Swiss sculptor (heart disease and chronic bronchitis);

January 12, 1966 (Wednesday)
The television series, Batman, produced by William Dozier and starring Adam West and Burt Ward as Batman and Robin, debuted as a mid-season replacement on the ABC network in the United States.  Each weekly episode was a two-part cliffhanger, following a formula of the heroes facing their demise from the villain on Wednesday evening, and the duo's escape and triumph on the Thursday installment.  Written primarily by Lorenzo Semple, the show combined camp humor with the action film genre, and appealed to both adults and children.
In his first State of the Union Address as President of the United States, Lyndon Johnson told Congress and television viewers that the nation could afford both the funding of the cost of social programs and an ongoing war, saying "I believe that we can continue the Great Society while we fight in Vietnam."  Johnson also proposed the creation of a new cabinet level department, the United States Department of Transportation.
The body of India's Prime Minister Lal Bahadur Shastri was cremated in a traditional Hindu ceremony in New Delhi on the day after his death.  As a crowd estimated at over 1,000,000 mourners watched, along with Soviet Prime Minister Kosygin, U.S. Vice-President Hubert Humphrey, India's President Sarvepalli Radhakrishnan, and Acting Prime Minister Gulzarilal Nanda watched as Shastri's son lit a funeral pyre.  Afterward, the ashes were scattered in the Yamuna River.

January 13, 1966 (Thursday)
The strike by New York City's public transportation workers ended after twelve days of traffic jams caused by the halting of subway and bus service. During the strike New York City businesses lost an estimated $1,500,000,000 in business revenues, and the cost to the city of increased wages and benefits was $52,000,000.
Gemini launch vehicle (GLV) 8 was erected at complex 19. After the vehicle was inspected and umbilicals connected, power was applied January 19. Subsystems Reverification Tests began the following day and lasted until January 31. The Prespacecraft Mate Verification of GLV-8 was run February 1. A launch test-procedure review was held February 2-3. During leak checks of the stage II engine on February 7, small cracks were found in the thrust chamber manifold. X-rays revealed the cracks to be confined to the weld; rewelding eliminated the problem. Systems rework and validation were completed February 9.
Police in Beverly Hills, California foiled a plot to kidnap millionaire tire executive Leonard Firestone, but inadvertently killed the informant who had alerted them to the plot. George Skalla had tipped off police that his friend, William Calvin Bailey, was planning to invade Firestone's home, then hold the business leader for a two million dollar ransom. Firestone and his family were safely away, and four members of the police were waiting at his mansion when Bailey and Skalla, who police said was afraid to back out of the plan, arrived. Skalla was instructed not to wear a mask and to drop to the floor as soon as he and Bailey entered the house, but when Bailey aimed a pistol at the police, they opened fire and killed both men.
In fiction, "Tabitha Stevens" was born on an episode in the second season of the popular television show Bewitched. The story arc of the pregnancy of TV character Samantha Stevens had been written to coincide with the pregnancy of actress Elizabeth Montgomery during 1965. Off screen, Montgomery and her husband, Bewitched producer William Asher, had become parents to a son, Robert Asher, born on October 5, 1965.
Born: Patrick Dempsey, American actor and race car driver, in Lewiston, Maine

January 14, 1966 (Friday)

Operation Crimp came to an end.
Avianca Flight 4, a Douglas C-54 Skymaster, crashed into the Caribbean Sea just after takeoff from Cartagena-Crespo Airport in Cartagena, Colombia, killing 56 of the 64 people on board.
MSFC issued requests for proposals to the aerospace industry for definition studies of integrating experiment hardware into AAP space vehicles - i.e., payload integration in the Apollo lunar module, the Saturn instrument unit, and the S-IVB stage of the Saturn IB and Saturn V launch vehicles. Following evaluation of the proposals, MSFC would select two or more firms for negotiation of nine-month study contracts to be managed by Huntsville as the Center responsible for payload integration of this portion of AAP. (MSC was responsible for payload integration of the Apollo CSM.)
In a note to Apollo Director Samuel C. Phillips, Staff Assistant Leonard Reiffel pointed to a number of weaknesses in the organizational structure of the Manned Space Flight Experiments Board and suggested several ways in which the Board might be made less cumbersome and more effective. Reiffel suggested beefing up the board's influence in decisionmaking on experiments; improving the quality of briefings and technical support to the board; and improving communications and coordination between the board and the NASA program offices, as well as the U.S. Department of Defense.
Died: Sergei Korolev, 59, Soviet rocket engineer who was chiefly responsible for the advances of the Soviet Union's space program in the 1950s and early 1960s. Korolev, whose importance had remained undisclosed by the Soviet press during his lifetime, died during surgery for removal of a tumor in his colon. In an editorial a week later, The New York Times eulogized him by noting that "[D]eath has finally declassified the role and identity of Academician Sergei P. Korolev, the man who provided the scientific and technical leadership of the Soviet rocket program... Korolev's rockets were powerful enough to send men into orbit and to put cameras into position to photograph the back side of the Moon. But they were too weak to break the chains of secrecy that denied him, while he lived, the world applause he deserved...."

January 15, 1966 (Saturday)

In Nigeria, a conspiracy referred to as "The Majors' Coup" because of the military rank of the coup leaders was carried out.  Nigerian Prime Minister Abubakar Balewa, and the Northern State premier Ahmadu Bello and the Western State premier, Chief Samuel Ladoke Akintola, were all murdered, along with Balewa's Finance Minister, Festus Okotie-Eboh.  Major Emmanuel Ifeajuna led his officers into Balewa's residence in Lagos.  Balewa had surrendered to the officers after being assured of his safety.  When the coup attempt collapsed, Balewa was shot to death.  President Nnamdi Azikiwe was out of the country at the time, taking a vacation on a cruise ship.
Air-to-air combat in Vietnam took on a new dimension, when a U.S. Navy RF-8 reconnaissance airplane spotted a MiG-21 jet fighter with North Vietnamese insignia.  Previously, the North Vietnam Air Force had had little success with MiG-17 fighters, which were slower and had fewer missiles than the American F-105 jets.
Slightly less than a month after Britain had started an oil embargo, Rhodesia's supply of gasoline ran out as the storage facilities at the Feruka Refinery ran dry.
The 1966 Five Nations Championship in rugby union began with a 3-3 tie between Scotland and France at Edinburgh, and an 11-6 win by Wales over England at London.  Each of the national teams (the other was Ireland) would play each other once during the competition.

January 16, 1966 (Sunday)
One day after the military coup that killed many of the leaders in Nigeria during the absence of President Nnamdi Azikiwe, Acting President Nwafor Orizu announced to the nation that "I have tonight been advised by the Council of Ministers that they had come to the unanimous decision voluntarily to hand over the administration of the country to the Armed Forces of the Republic, with immediate effect." In that most of the government ministers had been hiding out of fear of assassination, there were few Council members present, but Orizu passed along the military statement that "All Ministers are assured of their personal safety by the new administration." Orizu finished by announcing that he would surrender the presidency to Major General Johnson Aguiyi-Ironsi.
The BBC began broadcasting a television adaptation of David Copperfield, which starred Ian McKellen as David and Flora Robson as Betsey Trotwood.
The Quindío Department was created as a separate province within the Republic of Colombia.
Project Surefire verification testing began at Bell Aerosystems. Bell's part in the test program was to demonstrate the sea-level flightworthiness of the modified Agena main engine. Bell completed testing on March 4 with a full 180-second mission simulation firing. The successful completion of this phase of the test program gave the green light for the launch of Gemini Agena target vehicle 5003, scheduled for March 15.
The Space Science Board of the National Academy of Sciences issued a report outlining research objectives in lunar and planetary exploration for the 1970s and early 1980s. (The report, first of a series entitled Space Research: Directions for the Future, had been prepared by a group of scientists and engineers led by Gordon J. F. MacDonald of the University of California, Los Angeles.) The report affirmed earlier recommendations by the Space Science Board to NASA that uncrewed exploration of Mars should have first priority in the post-Apollo space era. Secondary importance was assigned to detailed investigation of the lunar surface and to uncrewed Venus probes. Clearly, the report reflected a predominant mood within the scientific community that scientific research in space should take predominance over crewed programs whose chief objectives, said the report, were "other than scientific."
Died:
General Courtney Hodges, 79, American military commander who commanded the U.S. First Army during World War II, and the first U.S. soldiers to invade Germany
Clarice Mayne, 79, English actress, singer and performer
Sadhu T. L. Vaswani, 86, Indian scholar and educator

January 17, 1966 (Monday)
Three hydrogen bombs were dropped on Spain near the coastal town of Palomares, and a fourth one fell into the deep ocean, after the B-52 bomber carrying them collided with a KC-135 refueling airplane. Fortunately, none of the bombs detonated, though each of the four Mark 28 thermonuclear warheads had a 70-kiloton yield. Fortunately, no nuclear explosion was triggered (a 70 kiloton bomb would have collapsed most houses within a  radius) and the missing bomb did not fall under the control of forces hostile to the United States. All of the men on board the tanker were killed, and only four of the men on the B-52 were able to parachute to safety. Initial reports released to the press did not mention that the B-52 had been carrying thermonuclear bombs.
In Nigeria, the new Federal Military Government issued the Constitution Suspension and Modification Decree, replacing the elected local leaders and representatives with military governors who could issue edicts or enforce decrees.
At a NASA-McDonnell Management Panel meeting, W. B. Evans of Gemini Program Office reviewed possible future mission activities. Gemini VIII was planned to have three periods of extravehicular activity (EVA) - two in daylight, one in darkness - and would undock during EVA with the right hatch snubbed against the umbilical guide and the astronaut strapped into the adapter section. A redocking would be performed with one orbit of station-keeping performed before each docking. EVA would include retrieval of the emulsion pack from the adapter, the starting of the S-10 (Micrometeorite Collection) experiment on the Agena, and the use of a power tool. The astronaut would don the extravehicular support pack, use the hand-held maneuvering unit, and check different lengths of tether. The spacecraft would maneuver to the astronaut and the astronaut to the Agena. It would incorporate a secondary propulsion system burn with the Agena and would be a three-day mission. Gemini IX would also be a three-day mission and would include a simulated lunar module (LM) rendezvous (third apogee rendezvous), a primary propulsion system (PPS) burn with the docked Agena, a rendezvous from above, a simulated LM abort, a phantom rendezvous with three PPS burns (double rendezvous), EVA with the modular maneuvering unit, and the parking of the Gemini VIII and Gemini IX Agenas. Gemini X would include a dual rendezvous with a parked Agena and the retrieval of the S-10 experiment after undocking with the new Agena, using EVA.
Born:
Gary "Big Daddy" Goodridge, Trinidadian kickboxer, mixed martial arts athlete and world arm wrestling champion, in Saint James
Shabba Ranks, Jamaican singer, in Sturgetown, St. Ann, as Rexton Rawlston Fernando Gordon
Died:
Georges Figon, French "barbouze", shot himself on the eve of his second trial for the kidnapping of Mehdi Ben Barka.
Newcomb Mott, 27, American book salesman who had been arrested on September 4, 1965, when he sneaked across the border between Norway and the Soviet Union. Mott had been convicted on November 24 of illegal entry into the country, sentenced to 18 months in prison, and was being transferred by train to a forced labor camp in Murmansk. Soviet authorities said five days later that Mott had committed suicide while on the trip.

January 18, 1966 (Tuesday)

Robert C. Weaver became the first African American to serve as a member of the U.S. president's cabinet, as well as the first United States Secretary of Housing and Urban Development, hours after being confirmed by the U.S. Senate.  Weaver had already been serving as the Director of the U.S. Housing and Home Finance Agency when the HHFA was elevated to Cabinet-level status. By the time the storm eased, over 200 people had been killed in the U.S., half of them in the southeastern United States.  Deaths attributable to the storm came from being frozen to death, dying in fires started while people were trying to heat their homes, from heart attacks while shoveling snow or pushing cars, or in traffic accidents caused by slick roads.
A collision near Chandpur Port on the Padma River of East Pakistan, between a passenger ship and a steamship, killed 80 people and injured 38; almost 100 other people on the passenger launch, which had been traveling down the river from Faridpur.
The first of 608 performances of Sweet Charity opened at the Palace Theatre in New York City.
Born: Romário (Romário de Souza Faria), Brazilian footballer, football manager and politician, in Rio de Janeiro

January 30, 1966 (Sunday)
The United Kingdom announced that, effective February 3, it was halting nearly all trade with the southern African nation of Rhodesia, whose white minority government had unilaterally declared itself independent in November.  The British Board of Trade placed a ban on all new imports from Rhodesia, and a ban of all exports except for those for humanitarian purposes, such as food or medical aid.

January 31, 1966 (Monday)
After a 37-day moratorium that had started on December 24, 1965, the United States resumed the bombing of North Vietnam and launched Operation Rolling Thunder. Among the first targets destroyed were a bridge at Đồng Hới, a highway ferry complex in Thanh Hóa Province, and barges near the city of Vinh. In all, there were 58 air strikes that day, though only 10 were considered effective.
The Soviet Union launched Luna 9 from the Baikonur Cosmodrome at 5:42 p.m. local time as a lunar probe that would deliver a capsule to a controlled landing on the Moon. The probe would transmit photographs back to Earth after descending into the Oceanus Procellarum on February 3.
Gemini spacecraft No. 8 was transferred to complex 19 and hoisted to its position atop the launch vehicle. Cables were connected for test February 1-2, and Prespacecraft Mate Verification Tests were conducted February 3-8. Fuel cells were activated February 8 and deactivated the following day. Spacecraft / launch vehicle integrated tests began February 10.
Born: Umar Alisha, Indian spiritual leader, 9th peetadhipathi of Sri Viswa Viznana Vidya Adhyatmika Peetham, at Pithapuram
Died: Carolyn Mitchell (Barbara Rooney), 29, American actress and fifth wife of actor Mickey Rooney, was found dead at the Rooneys' home in Brentwood, California, only ten days after the two had legally separated. She had been the victim of a murder-suicide, shot by her boyfriend, Serbian film actor Milos Milosevic, who then committed suicide. The day before, Mrs. Rooney had visited her husband in the hospital and had discussed a reconciliation.

References

1966
1966-01
1966-01